Mikhail Ivanovich Cherkov (St. Petersburg, August 14, 1829 - Paris, October 19, 1905) was a Russian Cavalry General and statesman who served as Governor-General of Warsaw in Poland between 1900 and 1905.

He joined the Tsarist Army in December 1851 a lieutenant and he took part in the Crimean War. In 1859–1860, he fought against insurgents in the Caucasus.

In 1861-64 he was governor and military commander of the Voronezh Governorate and between 1864 and 1866 of the Volhynian Governorate.
In 1867-68 he was deputy governor-general of Vilna, Kaunas, Grodno, and Minsk, and the chief of the Vitebsk and Mogilev provinces.

In 1868 he received the rank of lieutenant general.
In 1868-74 he was the military ataman of the Don Army. 
In 1877, during the Russo-Turkish War of 1877–78, he accompanied Emperor Alexander II to Chisinau.
Between April 16, 1878 and January 13, 1881, he was General Governor and Military Governor of the Southwestern Krai and the Kiev Military District.

From January 1881 he was a member of the State Council and from October to November 1881, he was a member of the Special Meeting for the Reorganization of Military Administration.

From March 1901 until the end of his life he was Governor-General of Warsaw and Commander of the Warsaw Military District.
In September 1902, he received the highest Prussian Award, the Order of the Black Eagle, when he visited Posen for German army maneuvers.

He died at the age of 76.
The Chertkovsky District, Chertkovo village and Chertkovo railway station were named after him.

Sources 
 Tchertkoff memorial
 KV.COM  
 DLIB.RSL 

1829 births
1905 deaths
Governors-General of Warsaw
Imperial Russian Army generals
Members of the State Council (Russian Empire)